Marina is a 1945 Mexican comedy film directed by Jaime Salvador and starring Tito Guízar, Amanda Ledesma and Federico Pineiro.

The film's sets were designed by Manuel Fontanals.

Cast
 Tito Guízar as Jorge  
 Amanda Ledesma as Marina  
 Federico Pineiro as Roque  
 Consuelo Guerrero de Luna as Teresa 
 Ernesto Alonso as Pascual  
 Rosita Segovia 
 Conchita Carracedo as Juana  
 Antonio Palacios 
 Fernando Fernández as Alberto 
 José Elías Moreno as Capitán  
 Luis Mussot 
 Fernando M. del Valle 
 María Elena Garcia 
 Cecilia Becerra 
 Luis Mussot hijo
 Daniel Pastor
 Humberto Rodríguez 
 Carmelita González as Pueblerina

References

Bibliography 
 Emilio García Riera. Historia del cine mexicano. Secretaría de Educación Pública, 1986.

External links 
 

1945 films
1945 comedy films
Mexican comedy films
1940s Spanish-language films
Films directed by Jaime Salvador
Mexican black-and-white films
1940s Mexican films